Demi-Gods and Semi-Devils, also known as Dragon Story, is a 1984 Hong Kong film based on Louis Cha's novel of the same title. The film was directed and produced by Siu Sang and starred Norman Chui, Kent Tong, Felix Wong, Idy Chan, Lam Jan-kei and Austin Wai. The film is not to be confused with the television series of the same title produced by TVB, which was also released in the same year and shared some common cast members (Tong, Wong and Chan played the same roles in the television series as well).

Cast
 Note: Some of the characters' names are in Cantonese romanisation.

 Norman Chui as Kiu Fung
 Kent Tong as Duen Yu
 Felix Wong as Hui-juk
 Idy Chan as Wong Yu-yin
 Lam Jan-kei as Ah-chu
 Austin Wai as Muk-yung Fuk
 Eddy Ko as Kau Mo-chit
 Lee Lung-kei as Duen Ching-sun
 Lau Kong as Ye-lut Hung-kei
 Chen Kuan-tai
 Lau Kwok-shing
 Cheung Hei
 Ling Hon
 Wang Han-chen
 Sham Chin-bo
 Tam Wai-man
 Leung Sam

External links
 

1984 films
Films based on works by Jin Yong
Hong Kong martial arts films
1980s Cantonese-language films
Films based on Demi-Gods and Semi-Devils
Wuxia films
Films set in the Liao dynasty
Films set in the Western Xia
1980s Hong Kong films